Zangheri is an Italian surname. Notable people with the surname include:

 Cornelia Zangheri Bandi (1664–1731), Italian noblewoman
 Renato Zangheri (1925–2015), Italian politician

Italian-language surnames